Allison Road is an unreleased first-person survival horror video game, that was being developed for Linux, Microsoft Windows and OS X by Lilith Ltd and formerly to be published by Team17. It was considered to be a spiritual successor to P.T., the playable teaser for the cancelled video game Silent Hills. Before being funded by Team17, the game's development was fan based. On 4 June 2016, the Allison Road Twitter account announced the game's cancellation. 

Two months later, on August 22, 2016 an announcement was made on the Twitter account indicating that work on the game had resumed. 
 
However, no further progress has been reported by the game's creators since with AR-related social media quietly deactivated.

Gameplay
The gameplay of Allison Road is similar to that of P.T., presenting a minimal storyline which the player must solve. While not wanting to reveal too much of the actual game, developers stated the full version may be slightly different. According to the development team, "pretty much all of our core mechanics are in place, however, some actually didn't make the cut-off for the video; the inventory is one of those things." 

Most of the objects found by the player in the house can be interacted with or inspected, and the player is shown in the teaser being able to equip bladed weapons such as a meat cleaver.

Plot
The player controls an unnamed protagonist who awakens in his townhouse with a splitting headache, who exclaims that he needs to find some aspirin. Exploring the ground floor of his house, the protagonist expresses confusion at seemingly-familiar objects and photographs, suggesting that he is also suffering from amnesia. After retrieving a packet of Lemsip tablets from the master bedroom, the protagonist exclaims that he needs water (to drink with the tablets), and ventures further around the house, gradually becoming stalked by a supernatural entity of some sort. As the player explores the house, evidence gathered from letters and photos suggest his family has been the victim of a heinous crime. 

Most rooms, including the back garden and patio of the house, can be explored by the player. Though some doors are initially locked, some eventually open as the teaser progresses. In the final moments of the trailer, the player discovers a ghoulish figure, assumed to be the ghost of his wife, which attacks him just before the screen cuts to black.

Development
On 1 July 2015, a 13-minute-long pre-alpha video was released. The style was considered a homage to P.T., the playable teaser for Silent Hills. The game was being developed on Unreal Engine 4. To fund the game, developer Lilith Ltd. created a Kickstarter asking for £250,000. However, the campaign was cancelled, as Team17 became the game's publisher, which would provide funds for the team to develop the game. 

The Switch releases were not certain, as Team17 had not yet promised that it would be released on those platforms. It was thought that it might when the game was being funded by Kickstarter. According to their website, the developers were aiming to a Q3 2016 release. On 4 June 2016, the Allison Road Twitter account announced the game's cancellation.

Two months later, on August 22, it was announced that development would resume without Team17 involvement as a publisher and under the newly formed studio Far From Home, consisting of the game's creator, Chris Kesler, and his wife.

As of 2019, Kesler is working full-time as concept artist and matte painter in the movie industry.

References

External links
 
Cancelled Linux games
Cancelled Windows games
Psychological horror games
Single-player video games
Survival video games
Unreal Engine games
Crowdfunding projects
Vaporware video games
Video games about ghosts
Video games developed in the United Kingdom